James Randall "Randy" Allen (born January 26, 1965) is an American former professional basketball player.

A  forward from Florida State University, Allen was never drafted by an NBA team but did manage to play two years in the league from 1988 to 1990 with the Sacramento Kings.  On October 1, 1990 Allen signed a two-year deal with the Denver Nuggets, but was released after the hiring of head coach Paul Westhead.  He was then signed by the Chicago Bulls on October 7, 1993 but was placed on waivers 10 days after signing.  In his NBA career, Allen played in 70 games and scored a total of 252 points.  Randy has two sons, Adam Allen and Brandon Allen. Adam played basketball and baseball for the University of Florida. Brandon Allen played professional baseball in the San Francisco Giants organization before joining the Florida State Seminoles men's basketball team.

External links
NBA stats @ basketballreference.com

1965 births
Living people
American expatriate basketball people in Belgium
American expatriate basketball people in France
American expatriate basketball people in Italy
American expatriate basketball people in Spain
Basketball players from Florida
CB Breogán players
CB Girona players
CB Peñas Huesca players
Cholet Basket players
Cedar Rapids Silver Bullets players
Florida State Seminoles men's basketball players
Liga ACB players
Omaha Racers players
People from Milton, Florida
Sacramento Kings players
Small forwards
Undrafted National Basketball Association players
American men's basketball players